The 1984 WCT Tournament of Champions was a men's tennis tournament played on outdoor clay courts in Forest Hills, Queens, New York City in the United States that was part of the World Championship Tennis circuit. It was the eighth edition of the tournament and was held from May 6 through May 13, 1984. Second-seeded John McEnroe won his second consecutive singles title at the event.

Finals

Singles

 John McEnroe defeated  Ivan Lendl 6–4, 6–2
 It was McEnroe's 6th singles title of the year and the 52nd of his career.

Doubles

 David Dowlen /  Nduka Odizor defeated  Ernie Fernandez /  David Pate 7–6, 7–5

References

External links
 International Tennis Federation Tournament (ITF) – tournament edition details

1984 World Championship Tennis circuit
World Championship Tennis Tournament of Champions
WCT Tournament of Champions
WCT Tournament of Champions